A lactotropic cell (also known as prolactin cell, epsilon acidophil, lactotrope, lactotroph, mammatroph, mammotroph) is a cell in the anterior pituitary which produces prolactin in response to hormonal signals including dopamine which is inhibitory and thyrotropin-releasing hormone and estrogen (especially during pregnancy), which are stimulatory. The inhibitory effects of dopamine override the stimulatory effects of TRH in non-pregnant, non-lactating sexually mature females. Other regulators include oxytocin and progesterone.

Prolactin is involved in the maturation of mammary glands and their secretion of milk in association with oxytocin, estrogen, progesterone, glucocorticoids, and others. Prolactin has numerous other effects in both sexes.

Prolactin cells are acidophilic by hematoxylin & eosin stains and comprise about 20% of all cells in the anterior pituitary gland.  If these cells undergo neoplastic transformation, they will give rise to a prolactinoma, a prolactin-secreting pituitary adenoma.

See also
 Hypothalamic–pituitary–prolactin axis

References

Peptide hormone secreting cells
Human cells
Human female endocrine system